Martyn Irvine (born 6 June 1985) is a Northern Ireland-born former cyclist, who competed professionally between 2008 and 2017 for the Pezula Racing, Planet X,  and  teams, and rode at the 2012 Olympic Games. He was also a directeur sportif for the  team.

Irvine is a 7-time Irish national track and road cycling champion cyclist, who represented the Irish National track team in the Omnium event at the World Cup Classics, and was world champion in the scratch race in 2013. He was UCI World Ranked 17th at the end of the inaugural 2010/11 Omnium season, with 315 ranking points.

Career

He signed with the UCI Asia based  for the 2011 season.

After the 2012 London World Cup event, he had 470 ranking points. He qualified for the Omnium event at the London Olympics where he finished 13th.

UnitedHealthcare (2013–2014)
In November 2012, Irvine signed a contract to ride with the  team for the 2013 season.

In February 2013 he won gold at the 2013 UCI Track Cycling World Championships in the Scratch Race, only an hour after winning a silver medal in the Individual Pursuit. Prior to Irvine, no Irish male rider had won a World Championship medal in 116 years. As a result, he was named as BBC Northern Ireland Sports Personality of the Year for 2013.

In February 2014, Irvine won a silver medal in the scratch race at the 2014 UCI Track Cycling World Championships.

Madison Genesis (2015)
In November 2014  announced that Irvine would join them for the 2015 season.

Retirement
After failing to qualify for the 2016 Summer Olympics in Rio de Janeiro, in January 2016 Irvine announced his retirement from competition.

Return with Aqua Blue Sport (2017)
In October 2016, he announced his comeback to professional cycling, signing with newly created Irish UCI Professional Continental team  for the 2017 season. He retired for the second time at the end of the season, joining the team's backroom staff.

Major results

Road

2005
 3rd Time trial, National Under-23 Road Championships
2007
 National Under-23 Road Championships
2nd Road race
3rd Time trial
2009
 1st  Overall Tour of the North
 National Road Championships
2nd Time trial
4th Road race
 3rd Senior race, National Criterium Championships
 5th East Midlands International CiCLE Classic
2010
 1st  Senior race, National Criterium Championships
 2nd Time trial, National Road Championships
2011
 1st  Senior race, National Criterium Championships
 1st Stage 7 An Post Rás
 5th Time trial, National Road Championships
 8th Lincoln Grand Prix
 9th Overall Tour of Ulster
1st  Mountains classification
2012
 National Road Championships
2nd Time trial
4th Road race
2013
 2nd Senior race, National Criterium Championships
2014
 3rd Time trial, National Road Championships
2015
 3rd Time trial, National Road Championships
 7th Overall An Post Rás

Track

2010
 National Championships
1st  1 km time trial
1st  Individual pursuit
 3rd  Team pursuit, Commonwealth Games
2011
 National Championships
1st  1 km time trial
1st  Individual pursuit
1st  Scratch
2012
 2012–13 UCI Track Cycling World Cup, Glasgow
2nd  Scratch
2nd  Individual pursuit
2013
 UCI Track World Championships
1st  Scratch
2nd  Individual pursuit
 1st  Points race, 2013–14 UCI Track Cycling World Cup, Manchester
 1st  Individual pursuit, National Track Championships
 3rd  Omnium, UEC European Track Championships
2014
 2nd  Scratch, UCI Track World Championships

Major championship results

References

External links

1985 births
Living people
Cyclists from Northern Ireland
UCI Track Cycling World Champions (men)
Cyclists at the 2012 Summer Olympics
Olympic cyclists of Ireland
Cyclists at the 2010 Commonwealth Games
Cyclists at the 2014 Commonwealth Games
Sportspeople from County Down
Commonwealth Games bronze medallists for Northern Ireland
Commonwealth Games medallists in cycling
Irish track cyclists
Medallists at the 2010 Commonwealth Games